The 2010 Davis Cup Europe Zone Group III was played between May 10 and May 15.
The competition was played in the Olympic Tennis Center Marousi, Greece.

The draw for the competition took place in Marousi on May 9 2010.

Group A

Matches

Iceland vs. Georgia

Malta vs. Luxembourg

Malta vs. Andorra

Luxembourg vs. Iceland

Andorra vs. Georgia

Malta vs. Iceland

Luxembourg vs. Georgia

Iceland vs. Andorra

Malta vs. Georgia

Luxembourg vs. Andorra

Group B

Matches

Greece vs. Albania

San Marino vs. Moldova

Armenia vs. Montenegro

Greece vs. Montenegro

Albania vs. Moldova

San Marino vs. Armenia

Play-offs

1st to 4th play-offs

Greece vs. Georgia

Moldova vs. Luxembourg

5th-place play-off – Montenegro vs. Malta

7th-place play-off – Andorra vs. Armenia

9th-place play-off – San Marino vs. Iceland

Final ranking 
 
 
 
 
 
 
 
 
 
 
 

Europe Zone Group Iii, 2010 Davis Cup
Davis Cup Europe/Africa Zone